The Fan (Spanish: El hincha) is a 1958 Spanish comedy sports film directed by José María Elorrieta. The film stars Ángel de Andrés, Antonio Riquelme and Mary Santpere.

Plot 
A passionate football player complicates the life of his family driven by his passion. Enthusiastic, fanatic, and passionate, the fervor of football runs through the blood of the main character as if it were a matter of life and death. Raised in an atmosphere of football art supporters, the young man organizes his life around this sport. The comedy is understood as a portrait of the world of football, from the point of view of day to day that passes the protagonist fan.

Cast

References

Bibliography 
 Pedro López Garcia. Alicantinos en el cine. Cineastas en Alicante. Editorial Club Universitario, 2013.

External links 
 

1958 films
1950s sports films
Spanish association football films
1950s Spanish-language films
Films directed by José María Elorrieta
1950s Spanish films